Philip of Artois (1358 – 16 June 1397, Micalizo), son of John of Artois, Count of Eu, and Isabeau of Melun, was Count of Eu from 1387 until his death, succeeding his brother Robert.

Philip was a gallant and energetic soldier. In 1383, he captured the town of Bourbourg from the English. He went on a pilgrimage to the Holy Land, and was imprisoned there by Barquq, the Sultan of Egypt, being released through the mediation of Jean Boucicaut and the Venetians. In 1390, he joined the unsuccessful expedition of Louis II, Duke of Bourbon, against Mahdia. In 1393, Philip was created Constable of France.

As a prominent Crusader, Philip was one of the French contingent sent to take part in the Battle of Nicopolis. He was captured in the battle, and subsequently died in captivity.

Marriage
On 27 January 1393, Philip married Marie (1367–1434), daughter of John, Duke of Berry. They had:
 Philip (1393-23 December 1397), likely already dead by the time news arrived in France of his father's death in an Ottoman Turk prison. Although he is buried in a tomb that names him as Count of Eu in the crypt of the Collegiale of Eu, he is generally not recognised as a count by historians and rarely given a regnal number.
 Charles of Artois, Count of Eu, captured at Agincourt (1394–1472)
 Bonne of Artois (1396 – 17 September 1425, Dijon), married at Beaumont-en-Artois on 20 June 1413, Philip II, Count of Nevers, and afterwards at Moulins-les-Engelbert on 30 November 1424, Philip III, Duke of Burgundy
 Catherine (1397–1418/22), married c. 1416 John of Bourbon, Lord of Carency

References

Sources

House of Artois
Christians of the Barbary Crusade
Christians of the Battle of Nicopolis
Artois, Phillip of
Constables of France
1358 births
1397 deaths